Lippy the Lion and Hardy Har Har is an animated television series produced by Hanna-Barbera and aired as part of the 1962 series The Hanna-Barbera New Cartoon Series starring the titular anthropomorphic lion and hyena duo in a series of goofy misadventures.

History
Lippy the Lion (voiced by Daws Butler impersonating Joe E. Brown) and Hardy Har Har the hyena (voiced by Mel Blanc) first appeared in The Hanna-Barbera New Cartoon Series in 1962, along with Wally Gator and Touché Turtle and Dum Dum. Mel Blanc used the same voice, personality and expressions for Hardy Har Har that he used playing the postman on the Burns and Allen radio show.

Their cartoons revolved around ever-hopeful Lippy's attempts to do a get-rich-quick scheme, with reluctant Hardy serving as a foil. Whatever the consequences were to Lippy's schemes, Hardy would end up getting the worst of it — a fact he always seemed to realize ahead of time, with his moans of "Oh me, oh my, oh dear". Although the intro shows them in a jungle setting proper for such beasts, most of the cartoons' stories took place in an urban setting.

Since then, the duo have been infrequently included in the cast of Hanna-Barbera's ensemble shows (e.g., Yogi's Gang). They were no longer constantly pursuing Lippy's get-rich-quick schemes, but their personalities were unchanged: Lippy was still the smiling optimist, Hardy the moaning pessimist.

Episode list

Cast
 Daws Butler - Lippy the Lion
 Mel Blanc - Hardy Har Har
 Additional Voices - Don Messick, Doug Young, Jean Vander Pyl, Janet Waldo

NOTE: Before the series regained its popularity among Hanna-Barbera fans, websites describing the series claimed that Mel Blanc left the series after 18 episodes, with Daws Butler taking over the role of Hardy as well as Lippy for the remaining 34 episodes. This is untrue, however - Mel Blanc voiced Hardy in all 52 episodes. This confusion likely came about because a prototype Hardy Har Har first appeared in a Snooper and Blabber cartoon several years before, in which he was voiced by Butler.

Home media
The show's first episode, "Sea-saw", is available on Saturday Morning Cartoons 1960's Vol. 2.

On July 9, 2019, Warner Archive released Lippy the Lion and Hardy Har Har: The Complete Series on DVD in region 1 as part of their Hanna-Barbera Classics Collection.

Other appearances
 Lippy the Lion and Hardy Har Har were seen in Yogi's Ark Lark. In one scene, Lippy was fed up with Hardy's behavior when those that were on the Noah's Ark were getting bored looking for the perfect place. Though he did save Hardy when the Ark ended up in a storm. Both of them were also in the TV movie's spin-off series Yogi's Gang. In both appearances, Hardy Har Har was voiced by John Stephenson while Daws Butler reprised Lippy.
 Lippy and Hardy appeared in one issue of a 1963 comic book by Gold Key Comics, and also featured in three issues of Gold Key's 1962-1963 Hanna-Barbera Bandwagon.
 Lippy and Hardy appeared in the 1977 Hanna-Barbera comic book issue called "The Flintstones' Christmas Party".
 Lippy and Hardy had appeared in an episode of Yogi's Treasure Hunt.
 Lippy and Hardy were seen in Yo Yogi!, voiced by Greg Burson and Rob Paulsen respectively. While Lippy owns a jewelry store, Hardy Har Har is a teenager that appears the episode "Tricky Dickie's Dirty Trickies" where Yogi ended up hanging out with Hardy after Dick Dastardly does something to get Yogi fired from the L.A.F. Squad so that Dick Dastardly can lead the L.A.F. Squad.
 Lippy and Hardy appeared in DC Comics Deathstroke/Yogi Bear Special #1 as captured animals alongside other Hanna-Barbera characters.
 Lippy and Hardy appeared in the series Jellystone! with Lippy the Lion voiced by Jeff Bergman in a Yiddish accent and Hardy Har Har voiced by Jenny Lorenzo in a Latina accent. Both characters are elderly, Hardy is also depicted as a female and wear glasses, and they are married. The episode "Face of the Town" reveals that Lippy is Jellystone's oldest citizen and that he knew Jellystone's founder Hubert Bartholomewbert who Lippy stated lied about his stories which he did for fame and money. The episode "Baby Shenangigans" reveals that Lippy and Hardy were still in their prime when they were 72.

References

External links
 
 
 Lippy the Lion and Hardy Har Har at Don Markstein's Toonopedia. Archived from the original on March 8, 2015.
 Episode guide at the Big Cartoon DataBase

1960s American animated television series
1962 American television series debuts
1963 American television series endings
American children's animated comedy television series
Animated television series about lions
Fictional hyenas
Animated television series about mammals
English-language television shows
Hanna-Barbera characters
Television series by Hanna-Barbera
Television series by Screen Gems
First-run syndicated television programs in the United States